At Last Bill Cosby Really Sings is an album by Bill Cosby. It is his fifth music-based album and the only one released on the Stax Records-distributed Partee Records. It features appearances from former Stevie Wonder band members like future R&B star Ray Parker Jr. on guitar, and also features a second collaboration with his songwriting partner Stu Gardner, who plays organ on the album.

A truncated, instrumental version of "Kiss Me" would serve as the theme for The Cosby Show ten years later.

Track listing

Side one
"Train to Memphis" (Stuart Gardner/Bill Cosby)
"Kiss Me" (Gardner/Cosby)
"No One Can Love the Way You Do" (Gardner/Cosby)
"Dedicated to Phyllis" (Cosby)

Side two
"It's Strange" (Gardner/Cosby)
"Put Love In Its Proper Place" (Gardner)
"Dance of the Frozen Lion" (Cosby/Gardner)
"Special Lady Sweetness" (Gardner)
"Take Your Time" (Gardner/Cosby)

Personnel
Bill Cosby – vocals, spoken word
Stu Gardner – piano, organ
Ray Parker Jr. – guitar
Ollie E. Brown – drums
Rudy Johnson – flute, saxophone
Sylvester Rivers – piano
Alexandra Richman – piano, synthesizer
Michael Boddicker – synthesizer
George Bohannon – trombone

External links
 
 At Last Bill Cosby Really Sings Discogs page

Bill Cosby albums
1974 albums
Stax Records albums